Lakshmi Planum is a plateau feature approximately 2 million sq km ringed by rugged mountains, the surface of Venus on the Western Ishtar Terra.  It is named after Lakshmi, the Hindu goddess of wealth. 

Lakshmi Planum is ringed by intensely deformed terrain, some of which is shown in the southern portion of the image and is called Clotho Tessera.

The plains of Lakshmi are made up of radar-dark, homogeneous, smooth lava flows.

References

Surface features of Venus
Lava plateaus
Volcanism on Venus